Antipterna trilicella is a species of moth in the family Oecophoridae, first described by Edward Meyrick in 1885 as Ocystola trilicella. It appears to be a moth endemic to Australia and confined to the east coast, occurring in Victoria, New South Wales and Queensland.

Meyrick's description

References

External links
Antipterna trilicella: images & occurrence data from Atlas of Living Australia

Oecophorinae
Taxa described in 1885
Taxa named by Edward Meyrick